The USC Trojans women's is a US soccer team that represent the University of Southern California in National Collegiate Athletic Association Division I women's soccer. The team competes in the Pac-12 Conference. The Trojans won national championships in 2007 and 2016.

History
Former USC women's soccer coaches Ali Khosroshahin and Laura Janke were indicted as part of the  2019 college admissions bribery scandal, for allegedly accepting bribes totaling hundreds of thousands of dollars to facilitate the admission of students to USC as soccer players recruited to the USC women's soccer team, despite their never having played soccer, and pled guilty.

All-Time Coaching Records

Current squad
As of 2022:

Source:

Year-by-year statistical leaders

References

External links